L. carnea may refer to:

 Lambis carnea, a sea snail
 Leptonia carnea, a pink-spored mushroom
 Leucania carnea, an owlet moth